Adriano José da Silva (born 25 September 1974), known as Adriano, is a Brazilian former professional footballer who played as a forward.

References

1974 births
Living people
Brazilian footballers
FC 08 Homburg players
1. FC Saarbrücken players
Rot-Weiß Oberhausen players
SC Verl players
Karlsruher SC players
2. Bundesliga players
Association football forwards
Brazilian expatriate footballers
Expatriate footballers in Germany
Brazilian expatriate sportspeople in Germany